The fourth season of the American animated sitcom Home Movies is the final season of series. The season was broadcast in the United States on the Adult Swim programming block for the television network Cartoon Network from November 11, 2003 to April 4, 2004. Co-creators Brendon Small and Loren Bouchard, along with Tom Snyder, served as executive producers for the season.

The series followed the adventures of 8-year-old aspiring filmmaker, Brendon Small, who writes, directs, and stars in homemade film productions that he creates with his friends Melissa Robbins and Jason Penopolis. Brendon and Melissa's soccer coach, John McGuirk, is a selfish, short-tempered alcoholic who constantly gives the two bad advice. Brendon's divorced single mother, Paula must deal with juggling her children, her job as a creative writing teacher, and her romantic life.

Episodes

Home release 
The DVD boxset for season four was released by Shout! Factory on May 16, 2006. Other than all thirteen episodes of the season, the DVD included several bonus features, including interviews with the cast and crew, animatics, an animation gallery, commentary tracks, and a bonus soundtrack CD.

Home Movies: Bonus CD 

Home Movies: Bonus CD is a soundtrack album to the show Home Movies. It was released May 16, 2006 and includes fifty-two songs which were featured throughout the series. The CD comes packaged with the DVD release of the show's fourth season box set. All music was written by Brendon Small.

Track listing 
All vocals by Brendon Small, except where noted.

Personnel 
 Brendon Small  – vocals, guitar, piano, drum machine, production

 Home Movies cast
 Jon Benjamin – vocals
 Janine DiTullio – vocals
 Melissa Galsky – vocals
 Emo Philips – vocals
 Todd Barry – vocals
 Laura Silverman – vocals

See also 
 Home Movies
 List of Home Movies episodes
 "Focus Grill"

References 

2003 American television seasons
2004 American television seasons
Home Movies (TV series) seasons